Ogygioses caliginosa is a species of moth of the  family Palaeosetidae. It is only known from Taiwan.

References

Hepialoidea
Moths described in 1932
Moths of Taiwan
Endemic fauna of Taiwan